Vertheuil is a commune in the Gironde department, Nouvelle-Aquitaine, in southwestern France.

Population

Notable people
Henri Calloc'h de Kérillis (1889–1958), aviator, reporter, writer and politician
Daniel Tinayre (1910-1994), Argentine filmmaker

See also
Communes of the Gironde department

References

Communes of Gironde